The following is a list of Arizona State Sun Devils men's basketball head coaches. The Sun Devils have had 17 head coaches in their 111-season history.

Arizona State's current head coach is Bobby Hurley. He was hired in April 2015 to replace Herb Sendek, who was fired by Arizona State at the end of the 2015 season.

References

Arizona State

Arizona State Sun Devils men's basketball coaches